The Colorado Department of Highways is the antecedent of today's Colorado Department of Transportation. 

Along with many other functions, it served as a bridge architect and at times as a bridge builder.  Many of its bridges are listed on the U.S. National Register of Historic Places.

Studies of Colorado's historic bridges, to assess which ones could qualify for National Register listing, were conducted in 1983, 1987, 2000, and 2011.  The latter study evaluated "712 bridges and grade separations" which had been built during 1959 to 1968.

Works (attribution) include:
Big Thompson River Bridge I, US 34 at milepost 65.53, Estes Park
Big Thompson River Bridge II, US 34 at milepost 66.22, Estes Park
Big Thompson River Bridge III, US 34 at milepost 85.15, Loveland
Big Thompson River Bridge IV, US 34 at milepost 86.04, Loveland
Black Squirrel Creek Bridge, built 1935, US 24 at milepost 327.33, Falcon  No longer exists.  Replaced in 2012.
Bridge over Arkansas River, U.S. Hwy 24, Buena Vista
Cherry Creek Bridge, CO 83 at milepost 46.30, Franktown
Colorado River Bridge, I-70 Frontage Rd. at milepost 62.90, De Beque
Cottonwood Creek Bridge, On Vincent Dr. over Cottonwood Creek., Colorado Springs
Dolores River Bridge, CO 90 at milepost 15.22, Bedrock
Dotsero Bridge, I-70 Service Rd. at milepost 133.51, Dotsero
Eagle River Bridge, US 6 at milepost 150.24, Eagle
Granada Bridge, US 385 at milepost 97.32, Granada
Gunnison River Bridge I, US 50 Service Rd. at milepost 155.41, Gunnison
Gunnison River Bridge II, US-50 Service Rd. at milepost 155.59, Gunnison
Little Fountain Creek Bridge, CO 115 at milepost 36.84, Widefield No longer exists.  Replaced in 2004.
Little Thompson River Bridge, I-25 Service Rd. at milepost 249.90, Berthoud
Maitland Arroyo Bridge, CO 69 at Milepost 3.0, Walsenburg
Marble Town Hall, 407 Main St., Marble
Maroon Creek Bridge, CO 82, Aspen
Ohio-Colorado Smelting and Refining Company Smokestack, NE of Salida at jct. of SR 150 and 152, Salida
Plum Bush Creek Bridge, US 36 at milepost 138.16, Last Chance
Rainbow Arch Bridge, CO 52, Fort Morgan
Rio Grande Railroad Viaduct, CO 120 at milepost 0.17, Florence
Rito Seco Creek Culvert, CO 142 at milepost 33.81, San Luis
Rouch Gulch Bridge, US 50 at milepost 230.12, Swissvale
San Luis Bridge, Off CO 159, San Luis
Spring Creek Bridge, US 24 at milepost 430.32, Vona
West Plum Bush Creek Bridge, US 36 at milepost 134.59, Last Chance

References

 
Bridges
Bridges
Colorado